Tony Wilds is an Australian cricket umpire. He has stood in several Domestic cricket matches in Australia including the Men's and Women's Big Bash League competitions. He has also stood in some Women's International matches. He also may work as a TV Umpire or a reserve umpire for these matches.

References

External links 
 List of matches umpired by Tony Wilds

Australian cricket umpires
Living people
Year of birth missing (living people)